Balaji Sadasivan ( or ; 11 July 1955 – 27 September 2010) was a Singaporean politician and neurosurgeon. He attended Raffles Institution, Siglap Secondary School and National Junior College, and studied medicine at the University of Singapore. After graduating in 1979, he continued his education at the Royal College of Physicians and Surgeons of Glasgow, becoming a Fellow of the Royal College of Surgeons (F.R.C.S.) in 1984. He also trained at the Henry Ford Hospital in Detroit, Michigan, from 1985 to 1989, and became a Fellow of Harvard University in 1990. He worked as a neurosurgeon until 2001, publishing over 50 book chapters and journal articles.

In 2001 Balaji was elected to the Parliament of Singapore for the Cheng San–Seletar division of the Ang Mo Kio Group Representation Constituency. From then until his death he served as Minister of State for the Ministry of the Environment (2001–2003), Ministry of Health and the Ministry of Transport (2001–2004); and subsequently Senior Minister of State for the Ministry of Health (2004–2006), the Ministry of Foreign Affairs (2006–2010) and Ministry of Information, Communications and the Arts (2004–2008). In 2007, he was appointed chairman of the executive board of the World Health Organization. In March 2008, Prime Minister Lee Hsien Loong reshuffled his cabinet, from which time Balaji retained only his portfolio at the Foreign Affairs Ministry until his death in 2010.

Balaji also served as president of the Asian Australasian Society of Neurological Surgeons, Singapore Indian Development Association (SINDA) and the Singapore Indian Education Trust, Chairman of the Indian Heritage Centre Steering Committee and a member of the National Art Gallery Implementation Steering Committee, Chairman of the National HIV/AIDS Policy Committee, a member of the National Steering Committee on Racial and Religious Harmony, an advisor to the Tamil Language Council and the People's Association Indian Activity Executive Committee Co-ordinating Council, a member of the Singapore Industrial and Services Employees' Union Council of Advisors, and Honorary Advisor to the Singapore Furniture Industries Council. In addition, he was an honorary member of the Singapore Medical Association.

Early years and education
Balaji Sadasivan was born on 11 July 1955 in Singapore, the son of Indian immigrants. A student at Raffles Institution, Siglap Secondary School (1969–1971) and National Junior College (1972–1973), he subsequently studied medicine at the University of Singapore. In his second year, he won an essay competition organised by the World Health Organization (WHO) and received the opportunity to attend a healthcare workshop in Minamata, Japan, where he learned about the devastating effects of Minamata disease, a neurological syndrome caused by severe mercury poisoning. This led him to specialise in neurosurgery later on, which was not a popular discipline at the time. In 1979, Sadasivan graduated with a Bachelor of Medicine and Bachelor of Surgery (M.B.B.S.), and two years later embarked on further studies at the Royal College of Physicians and Surgeons of Glasgow, becoming a Fellow of the Royal College of Surgeons (F.R.C.S.) in 1984. He trained at the Henry Ford Hospital in Detroit, Michigan, between 1985 and 1990, obtaining a diploma from the American Board of Neurology Surgery and becoming a fellow at Harvard University in 1990. He also worked at Brigham and Women's Hospital, a teaching affiliate of Harvard, and at the Children's Hospital Boston in Boston, Massachusetts. In 1997, he obtained a Bachelor of Laws (LL.B. (Hons.)) from the University of London.

Career

Balaji joined Tan Tock Seng Hospital as a consultant neurosurgeon in 1991, where he reorganised the way stroke patients were treated, arranged for the neurosurgical intensive care unit to be computerised, introduced stereotactic brachytherapy for dealing with brain tumours, and chaired the National Neuroscience Institute's planning committee. In 1994, he moved into private practice at Gleneagles Hospital, establishing the first stereotactic radiosurgical treatment system driven by a linear particle accelerator in Singapore. He also worked with medical device manufacturer Siemens to develop image-guided surgical systems. He published more than 50 scientific papers and chapters in neurology books.

Balaji left the medical profession to stand as a People's Action Party (PAP) candidate in the 2001 general election for the Cheng San–Seletar division of the Ang Mo Kio Group Representation Constituency (GRC). The electoral division, helmed by the Lee Hsien Loong (who became Prime Minister on 12 August 2004), was not contested, and Balaji was declared elected to Parliament on 25 October 2001. He was regarded as one of the "Super Seven" Members of Parliament who were made officeholders upon election, and served as Minister of State for the Ministry of the Environment (23 November 2001 – 11 May 2003), Ministry of Health and the Ministry of Transport (both 23 November 2001 – 11 August 2004). He was Senior Minister of State for the Ministry of Health from 12 August 2004 to 29 May 2006, handling matters such as the extension of the Human Organ Transplant Act to Muslims and the 2003–2004 severe acute respiratory syndrome (SARS) outbreak. He also worked to combat the spread of HIV, advocating education about the disease in schools and workplaces, and early and regular HIV testing. He brought in universal antenatal testing for HIV, and spoke out against discrimination on the ground of HIV status. For his constituents, he set up the Cheng San–Seletar Neighbourhood Club, and petitioned the Housing and Development Board for the lease of the Seletar Hills market, due to be torn down, to be extended. He also conceived an active ageing centre in Ang Mo Kio Town Garden East, which was slated to open in 2010.

Ang Mo Kio GRC was contested by the Workers' Party of Singapore in the general election of 2006, and Balaji retained his seat, the PAP winning with 66.14% of the votes polled in the constituency. Sadasivan acted as Senior Minister of State for the Ministry of Foreign Affairs and Ministry of Information, Communications and the Arts from 30 May 2006 to 31 March 2008. In May 2007, he was appointed Chairman of the WHO Executive Board, the first time a Singaporean had been so elected since the nation became a member of WHO. During his term, he dealt with issues such as global health development, pandemic preparedness (including the 2009 H1N1 flu pandemic), non-communicable diseases and climate change.

Later years
Balaji was diagnosed with colorectal cancer and underwent surgical removal of a malignant tumour in 2008. He relinquished his Information, Communications and the Arts portfolio with effect from 1 April 2008, remaining as Senior Minister of State for the Ministry of Foreign Affairs.

Balaji also served as president of the Singapore Indian Development Association (from March 2009) and the Singapore Indian Education Trust, Chairman of the Indian Heritage Centre Steering Committee and a member of the National Art Gallery Implementation Steering Committee, Chairman of the National HIV/AIDS Policy Committee, a member of the National Steering Committee on Racial and Religious Harmony, an advisor to the Tamil Language Council and the People's Association Indian Activity Executive Committee Co-ordinating Council, a member of the Singapore Industrial and Services Employees' Union Council of Advisors, and Honorary Advisor to the Singapore Furniture Industries Council. On 8 May 2010, he was made an honorary member of the Singapore Medical Association.

Following a relapse of his cancer, Balaji died in his sleep on 27 September 2010 at 1:50 a.m. at the age of 55 years, having suffered internal bleeding the previous night. He is survived by his wife, Dr. Ma Swan Hoo, his son Dharma Yongwen and daughter Anita Jiawen, and five siblings. On 18 October 2010, during a sitting of Parliament, Abdullah Tarmugi, Speaker of the Parliament of Singapore, and Mah Bow Tan, Leader of the House, paid tribute to Balaji in the presence of his widow and children, Mah saying "We have lost a dear friend and colleague and an outstanding Singaporean." Parliament then observed a minute's silence. Balaji's medical school classmates set up the Balaji Sadasivan Fund for Medical Undergraduates in his honour.

Selected works

Book
 (published posthumously).

Medical articles

.
.
.
.
.
.
.
.
.

References

External links
Cherishing Memories of Balaji – a blog set up by Sadasivan's medical school classmates

|-

|-

|-

|-

|-

1955 births
2010 deaths
Alumni of the University of London
University of Singapore alumni
Deaths from cancer in Singapore
Deaths from colorectal cancer
Fellows of the Royal College of Surgeons
Harvard Fellows
National Junior College alumni
Singaporean neurosurgeons
People's Action Party politicians
Raffles Institution alumni
Singaporean people of Indian descent
Members of the Parliament of Singapore
World Health Organization officials
Singaporean people of Tamil descent
Singaporean politicians of Indian descent
Singaporean officials of the United Nations